Vasco Babel Ribeiro Pessoa (born 22 November 1994) is a Portuguese professional surfer. Currently he's competing inn the WSL Men's Qualifying Series, mostly known as the QS which allows 10 surfers every year to qualify for the main competition, the Championship Tour. At club level he represents Estoril Praia.

Career 

In 2014, Vasco won the 2014 World Junior Championships, becoming the first Portuguese junior world champion in surfing.

He won the Liga MEO Surf, the portuguese national championship, for a five time record, winning it in 2011, 2012, 2014, 2017 and 2021.

WSL World Championship Tour

References

External links 

Portuguese surfers
1994 births
Living people
Sportspeople from Cascais
World Surf League surfers